The Silhouette (founded circa 1930) is a student newspaper at McMaster University, located in Hamilton, Ontario, Canada. The masthead staff consists of the Editor-in-Chief, a recently graduated student from McMaster, and approximately 15 paid full-time students. The newspaper is published every Thursday during the academic year, and once during each summer month. The circulation is 3,000 copies per week. The paper contains six major sections; news, opinions, sports, features, arts and culture, and Humans of McMaster.

The paper switched from broadsheet quarter fold to tabloid in August, 2014. In September, 2021, the paper switched from tabloid to 8.5x11" in order to focus on rebranding the Sil in an accessible format. Among the student population at McMaster, the paper is known as the Sil.

Currently, the paper has shifted its focus to a heavier online presence in order to become more accessible and grow with the ever-changing media landscape.

Notable contributors
Gary Lautens (November 3, 1928 – February 1, 1992), a Canadian humorist and newspaper columnist who wrote for the Toronto Star.
Eugene Levy (born December 17, 1946), a Canadian actor, comedian and writer.
Dave Thomas (born May 20, 1949), a Canadian comedian and actor.

See also
List of student newspapers in Canada
List of newspapers in Canada

References

External links 
The Silhouette
Dancing to Our Own Rhythm at the Silhouette Newspaper (McMaster University Dance Brain Project)

Student newspapers published in Ontario
Newspapers published in Hamilton, Ontario
McMaster University
Newspapers established in 1930
Weekly newspapers published in Ontario
1930 establishments in Ontario